Woodall may refer to:

People

Given name
Woodall Rodgers (1890–1961), attorney, businessman and mayor of Dallas

Surname
Al Woodall (b. 1945), American football player
Corbet Woodall (1929–1982), British newsreader for the BBC
Derek Woodall, rugby league footballer of the 1970s and 1980s for Castleford
Ian Woodall (b. 1956), British mountaineer
John Woodall (1570–1643), English military surgeon
John Woodall (footballer) (b. 1949), English professional footballer
John P. Woodall (1935–2016), British/American entomologist and virologist
Lee Woodall (b. 1969), American football player
Rob Woodall (b. 1970), American politician
Trinny Woodall (b. 1964), English fashion advisor and designer, television presenter and author

Places
Woodall, Oklahoma, United States
Woodall, South Yorkshire, England
Woodall Mountain, highest point in Mississippi, United States

Other uses
Woodall number, a subset of natural numbers in mathematics
Woodall, Tindall, Hebden & Co (The Old Bank) of Scarborough, North Yorkshire, the smallest of the banks, which in 1896 merged to form Barclays

See also
Woodhall (disambiguation)
Woodhull (disambiguation)